The Allen Academy, in the 1100 block of Ursuline in Bryan, Texas, was built in 1924. It was listed on the National Register of Historic Places in 1987.

It is a two-story masonry building with stucco exterior.  It has Mission Revival style with parapets.

References

National Register of Historic Places in Brazos County, Texas
Mission Revival architecture in Texas
Buildings and structures completed in 1924